Spencer Rocco Lofranco (born October 18, 1992) is a Canadian actor. He made his film debut in the 2013 romantic comedy At Middleton as Conrad Hartman, and portrayed the lead role of James Burns in the 2014 crime drama Jamesy Boy. He then co-starred as Harry Brooks in the biographical war drama Unbroken (2014) and Billy in the crime drama Dixieland (2015).

Early life
Lofranco was born in Toronto, Ontario on October 18, 1992, to Rocco (Rocky) C. Lofranco, a lawyer, and Amy Lofranco, an opera singer. His parents divorced when he was a child. He has one older brother, Santino, and was raised in Thornhill, Ontario. He attended Robert Land Academy military school from ninth grade through twelfth grade, after struggling with the traditional school system. Lofranco currently lives in Vancouver.

Career
On June 19, 2012, Lofranco was cast as Conrad Hartman, a high school senior touring a college campus, in the independent romantic comedy At Middleton. He starred alongside Andy García and Vera Farmiga in the film, which premiered at the Seattle International Film Festival on May 17, 2013, and was released in a limited release and through on video on demand on January 31, 2014.

He had his first starring role, as the troubled teenager James Burns, in Trevor White's biographical crime drama film Jamesy Boy. The film also starred Mary-Louise Parker, Ving Rhames and Taissa Farmiga, and was released on January 3, 2014, through video on demand before being released on January 17, 2014, in a limited release. 

In 2014, he co-starred in Angelina Jolie's war drama Unbroken as Harry Brooks, opposite Jack O'Connell, Finn Wittrock and Domhnall Gleeson. The film was released to theaters on December 25, 2014 by Universal Pictures. That same year, he also starred in the short thriller film Home, written and directed by John Henry Hinkel, playing the role of Mark. In 2015, he co-starred in the crime film Dixieland, alongside Riley Keough, Chris Zylka and Faith Hill. The film premiered at the Tribeca Film Festival on April 19, 2015. The film was released on December 11, 2015, in a limited release and through video on demand by IFC Films.

Personal life
On August 6, 2013, while driving his SUV, Lofranco hit actress Camille Banham, who was riding her bike at the time. Afterwards, Lofranco initially stopped his vehicle and apologized, but then returned to his vehicle and drove away without offering help, leaving Banham with a broken hip and other fractures. Lofranco was convicted of misdemeanor hit and run and sentenced to 50 days of community service.

Filmography

References

External links
 

1992 births
21st-century Canadian male actors
Canadian expatriate male actors in the United States
Canadian people of Italian descent
Canadian male film actors
Canadian male child actors
Living people
Male actors from Toronto